Sourp Amenapergitch is an Armenian Apostolic chapel in Strovolos, Nicosia, Cyprus.

The chapel is located within the premises of the Kalaydjian Rest Home for the Elderly in Strovolos, Nicosia, very near the AYMA club and the Sourp Asdvadzadzin church. It was built in 1995 by prominent businessmen Aram and Bedros Kalaydjian, both of whom served as Armenian Representatives in the House of Representatives,.

The chapel, dedicated to the Saviour of All, was built to address the spiritual needs of the Rest Home's residents and was consecrated by the Catholicos of Cilicia, Aram I, on 16 February 1997. Divine liturgies are celebrated there at least once a month by the parish priest of Nicosia, der Momig Habeshian.

References

Armenian diaspora in Cyprus
Chapels in Cyprus
Armenian churches in Cyprus